The Deutscher Chor London (DCL), also known as the German Choir of London, is a London-based amateur mixed-voice choir with a core repertoire of German classical choral pieces and a special interest in contemporary works. The choir was founded in 2009 by its current musical director Barbara Höfling.

DCL gives around twelve performances each year and has released two CD recordings.

About
DCL was founded in 2009 by singer and conductor Barbara Höfling. The initial membership was drawn largely from amateur singers associated with the Deutsche Evangelische Christuskirche in Knightsbridge, London. It has since grown to the be largest German choir in the UK.

Currently, the choir comprises around fifty active members of various nationalities. It continues to rehearse each week at the Christuskirche in Knightsbridge.

Repertoire

Classical
DCL's core repertoire is drawn from the German choral tradition of the seventeenth to late nineteenth centuries, in particular the works of Heinrich Schütz, Bach, Haydn, Brahms, Mendelssohn, Max Reger, Rheinberger and Bruckner.

The choir's repertoire extends to other works from the classical choral canon, including pieces by Vivaldi, Händel and Britten.

Contemporary
In addition to its core classical repertoire, DCL regularly performs new choral works. Its contemporary repertoire includes the following works commissioned for the choir itself:

 Ben See is part of our #CoronaCommissions project in 2020.
 Carol J. Jones is part of our #CoronaCommissions project in 2020.
 Jenni Watson's take on our #CoronaCommissions project in 2020 featured not only us but the Freiburg Saxophone Akademie as well.
 Sarah Rimkus is part of our #CoronaCommissions project in 2020.
 Luke Styles is part of our #CoronaCommissions project in 2020.
 Ian Stephens' "Unruhige Träume" with lyrics from the opening of Kafka's "Die Verwandlung" (The Metamorphosis) is part of our #CoronaCommissions project in 2020
 Donna McKevitt's "Fear" with lyrics from a poem by Jan Noble is part of the #CoronaCommissions project in 2020.
 Michael Cryne's "Fear no more" with lyrics from William Shakespeare's Cymbeline is part of our #CoronaCommissions project in 2020.
 Danyal Dhondy's "An die Freude" a take on the well-known piece by Ludwig van Beethoven with lyrics by Friedrich Schiller for our concert "A European Celebration" in 2019.
 Orlando Gough's contemporary settings of war poetry by Siegfried Sassoon and May Cannan for the choir's upcoming “Selig sind die Friedfertigen” tour in 2018.
 Matt Gio's "The Answered Hymn", written to mark the 500th anniversary of the Reformation in 2017.
 Sarah Rimkus wrote a beautiful piece for us in 2016 for a performance at the Queens Gallery at Buckingham Palace.
 Scottish-inspired works by composers, commissioned to accompany the Buckingham Palace exhibition of Scottish art in 2016.
 six new Volkslied arrangements for the choir's 2015 CD "Der Mond ist aufgegangen", by Gareth Treseder "Sehnsucht nach dem Frühling", Danyal Dhondy, "Kein schöner Land in dieser Zeit" and the choir's musical director Barbara Höfling "Deutsch-Englische Vogelhochzeit" and "Am Brunnen vor dem Tore".
 Orlando Gough's commission for the 2012 Thames Festival XX Scharnhorst.

Performances
The choir gives around twelve performances each year, encompassing: concert appearances in a range of venues; participation in church and cathedral services as a visiting choir; and charity engagements in London during the Christmas season.

Current projects
We are busy rehearsing for our next big concert scheduled for spring 2022. To commemorate Sophie Scholl we will perform Bach´s Matthäus Passion in a very unique and special way. More information to date and location will follow.
Due to the pandemic we are unfortunatelly not able to plan more concerts for 2021.

Past performances
DCL's performance history features collaborations with such ensembles as: the Choir of King's College, Cambridge; the choir of St-Martin-in-the-Fields; the German Choir Paris; the UK Parliament choir; the West London Bach Consort; Petersham Voices; the Keld Ensemble; and the respective choirs of several Lutheran congregations in London.

Special events and projects with which the choir has been involved include:
 2019: 10 year anniversary concert of GCL with Carl Orff Carmina Burana and 'A European Celebration' with 28 songs of the 28 countries belonging to the EU.
 2018: "Selig sind die Friedfertigen" / "Blessed are the peacemakers" tour. A series of events to commemorate the centenary of the end of World War I, including performances in York Minster, Highgate Cemetery, Menin Gate in Ypres, Brussels Cathedral, St Paul's Cathedral and Coventry Cathedral.
 2017: Reformation 500. A series of events marking the 500th anniversary of the Reformation, including services at Westminster Abbey and St Martin-in-the-Fields.
 2016: Samsung World Choir series. A 24-day event in December 2016, featuring 24 choirs from 24 different countries each in hour-long performances in Piccadilly Circus.
 2014: Hanover 2014. A series of events marking the 300th anniversary of the Hanoverian monarchy, including performances at The Queen's Gallery Buckingham Palace and the Christuskirche Knightsbridge.
 2013: Bonhoeffer's Music. A celebration of the life of Dietrich Bonhoeffer, including performances at St Albans Cathedral and St James Piccadilly.
 2012: Thames Festival. Performance of a new work by Orlando Gough in a concert aboard .

Major performances
2009
 December – Christuskirche London: Christmas Concert
 September – Christuskirche London: Vivaldi, Gloria

2010
 December – Christuskirche London: Christmas Concert
 November – Coventry Cathedral and Westminster Cathedral: War Requiem with Parliament Choir and Southbank Symphonia,
 June – Concerts with the German Choir Paris Magnificat in Paris and London

2011
 December – Christuskirche London: Christmas Concert
 November – Christuskirche London: Bach Cantata
 June – Recordings for Christmas CD "Der Englische Gruss?"
 April – Christuskirche London: A cappella Concert

2012
 December – Royal Naval Chapel Greenwich: Weihnachtsoratorium
 September – Thames Festival: new pieces by Orlando Gough
 September – Christuskirche London: Bach Cantata
 July – Beethoven 9th Symphony with Forest Philharmonic Orchestra
 July – Christuskirche London: Bach Cantata
 June – Filming of "streets of London" arrangement by Peter Gritton for WDR German Television
 May – Christuskirche London: A cappella Concert
 March – Master class: Bach Cantata with Christoph Siebert
 February – St Matthew Passion with West-London Bach Consort
 January – Christuskirche London: Bach Cantata

2013
 December – St Mary Magdalene, Richmond: A German Christmas in collaboration with Petersham Voices
 November – St James's Church Paddington: Mendelssohn's Psalms 2, 42, 43
 May – St James Piccadilly: Polyphony of Life – Bonhoeffer's Music
 May – St Albans Cathedral: Polyphony of Life – Bonhoeffer's Music
 April – Westminster Abbey: Evensong
 April – Royal Naval Chapel Greenwich: Evensong

2014
 December – Hampton Court Palace: German and English Christmas carols
 November – St Lawrence Jewry: Romantic songs by Brahms – Liebesliederwalzer, Zigeunerliederwalzer, Neue Liebesliederwalzer, Quartette
 October – The Queen's Gallery, Buckingham Palace: An enchanting dialogue between art and music, celebrating the music of 18th century composers Croft, Händel and Haydn
 June – Christuskirche Knightsbridge: O worship the king – 1714–2014: 300 years of Hanover Succession Works by Haydn, Mendelssohn, CPE Bach, Gluck, Steffani and others

2015
 December – St Lawrence Jewry and St George's Bloomsbury: Bach Christmas Oratorio
 November – Hampton Court Palace: Christmas Carols
 October – Counting House, Cornhill: CD Release "Der Mond ist aufgegangen"

2016
 December – St Paul's Cathedral: Evensong with Mendelssohn Motets
 December – Piccadilly Circus: Christmas Carols
 October – The Queen's Gallery, Buckingham Palace: Specially commissioned pieces of Scottish-inspired music to accompany the exhibition 'Scottish Artists 1750–1900: From Caledonia to the Continent'.
 June – St James's Church Paddington: Bach Motets
 April – St Paul's Cathedral: Evensong with works by Brahms and Schütz

2017
 December – St Lawrence Jewry: Händel – Dixit Dominus & Vivaldi – Gloria
 October – Westminster Abbey: Service in celebration of 500 years of Reformation
 August – Notre-Dame Paris: Service for the WWI centenary including works by Reger, Bruckner, Mendelssohn, Rheinberger and Brahms
 June – St James's Church Paddington: works by Brahms, Rheinberger, Bruckner and others
 March – St Giles' Cripplegate: Bach – Johannespassion, with Keld Ensemble
 February – St Martin-in-the-Fields: Choral Evensong to mark the 500th Anniversary of the Reformation, together with the Choir of St Martin-in-the-Fields and singers from Lutheran congregations in London
 February – King's College Chapel, Cambridge: Bach Vesper, together with the King's College Choir under the direction of Stephen Cleobury

2018
 November – St Paul's Cathedral, Liverpool Cathedral and Lichfield Cathedral
 October – Coventry Cathedral and Winchester Cathedral
 September – Canterbury Cathedral
 August – Menin Gate, Ypres and Cathedral of St. Michael and St. Gudula, Brussels
 July – Highgate Cemetery London
 May – York Minster, Wakefield Cathedral, Bradford Cathedral
 February – Wells Cathedral

2019
 December: Evensong, St Paul's Cathedral, London
 December: Weihnachtsoratorium BWV 248, St Lawrence Jewry and St Giles-without-Cripplegate, London
 October: Carmina Burana, Round Chapel, London
 June: Stabat Mater, St Mary-at-Hill, London
 March: A European Celebration, St Columbas Hall, London
 January: Christuskirche, London on Holocaust Memorial Day

2021
 April: Virtuel Concert

Discography
 Der englische Gruss, 2011 – a CD of Christmas music also featuring the Parliament Choir.
 Der Mond ist aufgegangen, 2015 – a CD of German and British folksongs also featuring several guest choirs. The tracks include new folksong arrangements from Gareth Treseder, Danyal Dhondy and choir musical director Barbara Hoefling.

Television appearances
 BBC News at Six, June 2017
 ARD – Ein Brexit und drei Millionen Sorgen, 7/6/2017
 WDR – Wunderschön! Visit London – Shopping, Songs und Sightseeing, 29/4/2012. DCL sang “Streets of London” by Peter Gritton.

References

External links 
 
 Official website of musical director Barbara Höfling
 Official website of composer Orlando Gough
 Official website of composer Danyal Dhondy
 Official website of composer Gareth Treseder

German choirs
Musical groups established in 2009
2009 establishments in the United Kingdom
Musical groups from London